Goodings is a surname. Notable people with the surname include:

 Allen Goodings (1925–1992), Bishop of Quebec
 Frits Goodings (1963–1989), Dutch footballer from Suriname
 Graeme Goodings (born 1948), Australian television journalist
 Lennie Goodings (born 1953), Canadian-born publisher

See also
 Gooding (disambiguation)
 Goodings Grove, Illinois